Policarpo Juan Paz García (7 December 1932 – 16 April 2000) was a Honduran military leader who served as President of Honduras from 7 August 1978 until 27 January 1982.

Biography
Paz Garcia was born in 1932 in La Arada, Goascoran, Valle, Honduras. He distinguished himself in the Football War, a brief war fought by El Salvador and Honduras in 1969.

Presidency
Following a 1978 military coup that ousted General Juan Alberto Melgar as chief of state, a three-man junta headed by Paz Garcia took power and announced that it would begin preparations for a return to civilian rule. A constituent assembly was popularly elected in April 1980 to write a new constitution, and on July 20, 1980 the junta handed control to the Assembly.

The Assembly appointed General Paz Garcia provisional president until general elections were held. The elections, in November 1981, were won by Roberto Suazo, and his Liberal Party of Honduras.

Last years
Paz died on 16 April 2000 at age 67, due to kidney failure.

References

1932 births
2000 deaths
Presidents of Honduras
Leaders who took power by coup
Honduran Roman Catholics
Deaths from kidney failure